Qaleh-ye Dokhtar (also Romanized as Qal‘eh-ye Dokhtar) is a village in Sorkh Qaleh Rural District, in the Central District of Qaleh Ganj County, Kerman Province, Iran. At the 2006 census, its population was 119, with 40 families.

References 

Populated places in Qaleh Ganj County